Cilfynydd railway station served the village of Cilfynydd, in the historical county of Glamorganshire, Wales, from 1900 to 1932 on the Llancaiach Branch.

History 
The station was opened on 1 June 1900 by the Taff Vale Railway. It closed on 12 September 1932. Nothing remains besides the viaduct.

References 

Disused railway stations in Rhondda Cynon Taf
Railway stations in Great Britain opened in 1900
Railway stations in Great Britain closed in 1932
1900 establishments in Wales
Former Taff Vale Railway stations